Timeline is an album by the American jazz group Yellowjackets, released in 2011. The album reached a peak position of number five on Billboard Top Jazz Albums chart, and was nominated for Best Jazz Instrumental Album at the Grammy Awards of 2012.

Track listing

Personnel 

Yellowjackets
 Russell Ferrante – keyboards, acoustic piano 
 Jimmy Haslip – bass 
 Will Kennedy – drums, keyboards
 Bob Mintzer – tenor saxophone, sopranino saxophone, bass clarinet

Guest Musicians
 Robben Ford – guitars (5)
 John Daversa – trumpet (2, 8)

Production 
 Yellowjackets – producers
 Gretchen Valade – executive producer 
 Rich Breen – recording, mixing, mastering 
 Ed Woolley – assistant engineer 
 Al Pryor – A&R direction
 Maria Ehrenreich – creative direction, production services 
 Randall Kennedy – creative direction
 Raj Naik – art direction, design, photography 
 Inbar Neer – styling, makeup 
 Karin Giron – styling and makeup assistant
 Recorded at Firehouse Recording Studios (Pasadena, CA).
 Mixed and Mastered at Dogmatic Sound (Burbank, CA).

References

2011 albums
Yellowjackets albums